This is a list of animated fictional towns, villages, settlements and cities. This list should include only well-referenced, notable examples of fictional settlements that are integral to a work of fiction and substantively depicted therein. Fictionalized versions of actual towns (such as Raytown, Missouri in Mama's Family and Wellsville, New York in The Adventures of Pete & Pete) are not included. Animated adaptations of comics, books, films and video games should only be listed if the animated version is notably different from the original work.

Notes

References 

Towns
Lists of fictional populated places